Isabel Russinova (born 20 January 1958) is a Bulgarian-born Italian  actress, producer and television personality.

Biography 
Born in Sofia as Maria Isabella Cociani, Russinova came to the success in 1983 with the Rai Uno musical show Discoring. The same year, she co-hosted the Sanremo Music Festival. She later hosted several television programs, and she appeared as an actress in a number of films and TV-series. Russinova is also the artistic director of the film, television and theater production company Ars Millennia and the director of the Bravo theater festival.

After her experience as a model and popularity in the eighties in the television and cinema field, she is today a cultural operator, playwright, writer and producer of cinema and theater.

Her attention to social, equal opportunity and the defense of human rights, have led to be today the official testimonial of Amnesty International.

Bibliography

References

External links 

 

Living people
1958 births
Actresses from Sofia
Italian television actresses
Italian film actresses
Italian stage actresses
Italian television personalities
Bulgarian emigrants to Italy